The Chrysler Valiant (CL) is an automobile which was produced in Australia by Chrysler Australia from 1976 to 1978. The CL, which was the twelfth Australian Chrysler Valiant model, replaced the Chrysler Valiant (VK). It was also built in South Africa by Sigma, who marketed it there as the Chrysler SE.

Changes
The Chrysler CL models featured new grilles, a new nose cone and new bonnet, and, (on sedans), new rear panels including boot lid, lower panel and quarter panel. A panel van body style was added to the range in April 1977.

Model range
The Chrysler CL passenger car range comprised 4 door sedan, 5 door station wagon and 2-door coupe body styles in the following models:
 Chrysler Valiant Sedan
 Chrysler Valiant Wagon
 Chrysler Regal Sedan
 Chrysler Regal Wagon
 Chrysler Regal SE Sedan
 Chrysler Charger 770 Coupe

The Chrysler CL commercial vehicle range comprised a 2-door coupe utility and a 2-door panel van.
 Chrysler Valiant Utility
 Chrysler Valiant Panel Van

Regal and Charger models were not designated as Valiants.

Limited edition models and option packs
 A limited edition Chrysler Le Baron luxury model was announced in April 1978. 400 examples were produced.
 A Charger XL model was available, but only as the K16 Police Pursuit Special with the 318 V8 engine and automatic transmission.
 A Sports Pack was available for the Panel Van and the Utility as Option A53.
 A Drifter Pack was offered for the Panel Van and Utility. Models fitted with this option were marketed under the Chrysler Drifter name.
 A Charger Drifter pack was offered as Option A34 (white) and Option A49 (Impact Orange, Sundance Yellow or Harvest Gold).

Engines and transmissions
Three engines were offered:
  I6
  I6
  V8

Four transmissions were offered:
3 speed manual
4 speed manual
3 speed Borg-Warner 35 automatic (6 cylinder models only)
3 speed TorqueFlite A904 automatic (V8 powered models only)

Production and replacement
32,672 CL models were built prior to the replacement of the CL by the Chrysler Valiant (CM) in 1978.

South Africa

In 1978 a model of the CL Regal was introduced in South Africa for local assembly. These cars came equipped with a locally-built four-barrel 225 slant-six producing . While the performance came in for some criticism, fuel economy and brakes received higher marks. The SE only came as a fully equipped model, with the interior and suspension having received some fettling in Detroit prior to Sigma finishing development in South Africa.

References

Cars of Australia
Valiant vehicles
Valiant (CL)
Cars introduced in 1976
1970s cars